Anton Igorevich Shantyr (born 25 April 1974 in Budapest) is a retired Russian professional road bicycle racer.

Palmares 

1996
 , Olympic Games - Team Pursuit
1997
 winner Sachsen Tour

External links 
 
 

1974 births
Living people
Russian male cyclists
Russian track cyclists
Olympic cyclists of Russia
Cyclists at the 1996 Summer Olympics
Cyclists at the 2000 Summer Olympics
Olympic silver medalists for Russia
Cyclists from Budapest
Olympic medalists in cycling
Medalists at the 1996 Summer Olympics